Manappadam is a village in the Palakkad district of Kerala state, south India. It is in Puthucode Panchayath. Vadakkencherry is the nearest town. Pin code is 678689.

References

Villages in Palakkad district